Stanley Getz (February 2, 1927 – June 6, 1991) was an American jazz saxophonist. Playing primarily the tenor saxophone, Getz was known as "The Sound" because of his warm, lyrical tone, with his prime influence being the wispy, mellow timbre of his idol, Lester Young. Coming to prominence in the late 1940s with Woody Herman's big band, Getz is described by critic Scott Yanow as "one of the all-time great tenor saxophonists". Getz performed in bebop and cool jazz groups. Influenced by João Gilberto and Antônio Carlos Jobim, he also helped popularize bossa nova in the United States with the hit 1964 single "The Girl from Ipanema".

Early life
Stan Getz was born on February 2, 1927, at St. Vincent's Hospital in Philadelphia, Pennsylvania, United States. Getz's father Alexander ("Al") was a Ukrainian Jewish immigrant who was born in Mile End, London, in 1904, while his mother Goldie (née Yampolsky) was born in Philadelphia in 1907. His paternal grandparents Harris and Beckie Gayetski were originally from Kyiv, Ukraine but had migrated to escape the anti-Jewish pogroms to Whitechapel, in the East End of London. While in England they owned the Harris Tailor Shop at 52 Oxford Street for more than 13 years. In 1913, Harris and Beckie emigrated to the United States with their three sons Al, Phil, and Ben, following their son Louis Gayetski who had emigrated to the US the year before.  Getz's original family name, "Gayetski", was changed to Getz upon arrival in America.

The Getz family first settled in Philadelphia, but during the Great Depression the family moved to New York City, seeking better employment opportunities. Getz worked hard in school, receiving straight A's, and finished sixth grade close to the top of his class. Getz's major interest was in musical instruments and he played a number of them before his father bought him his first saxophone, a $35 alto saxophone, when he was 13. He moved on quickly to play all other saxophones, as well as the clarinet, but fell in love with the sound of the tenor saxophone, and began practicing eight hours a day. According to Getz, he only had about six months of lessons and never studied music theory or harmony.

Getz attended James Monroe High School in the Bronx. In 1941, he was accepted into the All-City High School Orchestra of New York City. This gave him a chance to receive private, free tutoring from the New York Philharmonic's Simon Kovar, a bassoon player. He also continued playing the saxophone at dances and bar mitzvahs. He eventually dropped out of school in order to pursue his musical career but was later sent back to the classroom by the school system's truancy officers.

Career

Beginnings
In 1943, at the age of 16, he joined Jack Teagarden's band and, because of his youth, he became Teagarden's ward. Getz also played along with Nat King Cole and Lionel Hampton. A period based in Los Angeles with Stan Kenton was brief. Following a comment from Kenton that his main influence, Lester Young, was too simple, he quit. After performing with Jimmy Dorsey, and Benny Goodman, Getz was a soloist with Woody Herman from 1947 to 1949 in "The Second Herd", and he first gained wide attention as one of the band's saxophonists, who were known collectively as "The Four Brothers"; the others being Serge Chaloff, Zoot Sims and Herbie Steward. With Herman, he had a hit with "Early Autumn" in 1948.

After Getz left "The Second Herd", he was able to launch his solo career. Horace Silver's trio was heard by Getz as the guest soloist at the Club Sundown in Hartford, Connecticut, in 1950, and he hired them for touring gigs, gaining Silver his earliest national exposure. For an unknown period, Silver was not paid by Getz, who was using the money due the pianist to buy heroin. Silver finally left in June 1952. In the same period, Getz performed with pianists Al Haig and Duke Jordan and drummers Roy Haynes and Max Roach, as well as bassist Tommy Potter, all of whom had worked with Charlie Parker. Guitarists Jimmy Raney and Johnny Smith were also associated with the saxophonist in this period. His profile was enhanced by his featured performance on Johnny Smith's version of the song "Moonlight in Vermont", recorded in 1952, which became a hit single and stayed on the charts for months. A DownBeat readers' poll voted the single as the second best jazz record of 1952. The later album Moonlight in Vermont, reconfigured from two 10 inch LPs for a 12-inch release, was issued in 1956.

A 1953 line-up of the Dizzy Gillespie/Stan Getz Sextet featured Gillespie, Getz, Oscar Peterson, Herb Ellis, Ray Brown and Max Roach. He moved to Copenhagen, Denmark in 1958. Here he performed with pianist Jan Johansson and bassist Oscar Pettiford, among others, at the Club Montmartre.

Return to United States
Returning to the U.S. from Europe in 1961, Getz recorded the album Focus with arrangements by Eddie Sauter, who created a strings backing for the saxophonist. In a March 2021 article for the All About Jazz website, Chris May wrote of it as "one of the great masterpieces of mid-twentieth century jazz" and compared it to the work of Béla Bartók.

Getz became involved in introducing bossa nova music to the American audience. Teaming with guitarist Charlie Byrd, who had just returned from a U.S. State Department tour of Brazil, Getz recorded Jazz Samba in 1962. Getz won the Grammy for Best Jazz Performance of 1963 for his cover of Antonio Carlos Jobim's "Desafinado", from Jazz Samba. It sold over one million copies, and was awarded a gold disc. His second bossa nova album, also recorded in 1962, was Big Band Bossa Nova with composer and arranger Gary McFarland. As a follow-up, Getz recorded the album, Jazz Samba Encore!, with one of the originators of bossa nova, Brazilian guitarist Luiz Bonfá. It also sold more than a million copies by 1964, giving Getz his second gold disc.

He then recorded the album Getz/Gilberto, in 1963, with Antônio Carlos Jobim, João Gilberto and his wife, Astrud Gilberto. Their recording of "The Girl from Ipanema" won a Grammy Award. Getz/Gilberto won two Grammys (Best Album and Best Single). As a single (1964), "The Girl from Ipanema" became a smash hit. Getz and producer Creed Taylor claimed that the music's success was a result of their discovery of the talent of Astrud Gilberto, who had never before been recorded as a vocalist, shifting the spotlight away from her and depriving her of credit, when it had been her vocal rendition that had made the song a smashing success with the general public. Getz even made sure she got none of the royalties. Gilberto and later her and João Gilberto's son Marcelo disputed Getz and Taylor's version of the story.

A live album, Getz/Gilberto Vol. 2, followed, as did Getz Au Go Go (1964), a live recording at the Cafe au Go Go. While still working with the Gilbertos, he recorded the jazz album Nobody Else But Me (1964), with a new quartet including vibraphonist Gary Burton, but Verve Records, wishing to continue building the Getz brand with bossa nova, refused to release it. It came out 30 years later, after Getz had died.

Later career
In 1972, Getz recorded the jazz fusion album Captain Marvel with Chick Corea, Stanley Clarke and Tony Williams, and in this period experimented with an Echoplex on his saxophone. He had a cameo in the film The Exterminator (1980).

In the mid-1980s, Getz worked regularly in the San Francisco Bay area and taught at Stanford University as an artist-in-residence at the Stanford Jazz Workshop until 1988. In 1986, he was inducted into the DownBeat Jazz Hall of Fame. During 1988, Getz worked with Huey Lewis and the News on their Small World album. He played the extended solo on part 2 of the title track, which became a minor hit single.

His tenor saxophone of choice was the Selmer Mark VI.

Personal life

Getz married Beverly Byrne, a vocalist with the Gene Krupa band, on November 7, 1946, in Los Angeles; the couple had three children, Steve, David and Beverly. As a teenager, Getz had become involved with drugs and alcohol. In 1954, he was arrested for attempting to rob a pharmacy for morphine. As he was being processed in the prison ward of Los Angeles County-USC Medical Center, Beverly gave birth to their third child one floor below.

Getz was divorced from Byrne in Mexico in 1956, after which, due to Byrne's own addictions, she was unable to take care of the children. Eventually, the children were rescued and awarded by the Court to Getz's second wife, Monica Silfverskiöld, daughter of Swedish physician and former Olympic medalist Nils Silfverskiöld and Swedish Countess Mary von Rosen. Monica had insisted on raising the family together, as the children had been divided among family members, and eventually, they raised five children: Steven, David, Beverley, Pamela, and Nicolaus, the last two of which were from their own marriage. The couple lived in Copenhagen, Denmark, partly to escape the prevalence of drugs in America at the time. Monica would also become Stan's manager and a major influence in his life.

In 1962, Monica returned with the family to Sweden after having discovered Stan's recurring addictions. During the following period, as he was trying to persuade her to come back, he sent her two test pressings, one of which, Jazz Samba with Charlie Byrd, was pivotal to her plans for the next record, Getz/Gilberto. However, Getz's association with Byrd soured, due to a lawsuit initiated by Byrd.

After Getz promised to stay clean and sober, Monica returned from Sweden with the family. On November 21, 1962, Brazil sent scores of musicians to Carnegie Hall as a result of the bossa nova craze created by Jazz Samba. After being told by Gilberto and Jobim that Getz had been an invisible partner in their creating of the Bossa Nova by superimposing Getz's Jazz harmonies and sound on the old Samba, Monica suggested a unification of the three. Jobim and Gilberto reacted with deference and enthusiasm. Getz was reluctant, at first, as he had heard the two were "difficult." Getz had reportedly said that he was convinced, when Monica retorted, "Well, don't you have a reputation for being difficult?" They would become very close friends during the recording of Getz/Gilberto, and Gilberto would even move in with the Getzes, occasionally joined by the children of his own two marriages and his second wife, Miúcha.

In the early 1980s, Getz again relapsed into his addictions, resulting in an arrest with an illegal gun in the home with Monica and some of the children. This resulted in an Order of Protection, issued in her favor, which contained a clause that Getz must be sober to be allowed into the house and an Order he go to treatment. As a countermove, Getz filed for divorce from Monica in 1981, but the couple reconciled at his insistence in 1982 and signed a Reconciliation Agreement, in which they agreed to jointly buy a house they found in San Francisco. Soon after, however, Getz relapsed. After a second illegal gun/cocaine incident, Monica returned to their New York home. At this time, she discovered the need for the courts to learn about addictions and founded the National Coalition for Family Justice in 1988, around the time a divorce was finalized. In 1990, Monica Getz petitioned the United States Supreme Court to have their divorce verdict overturned, although they declined. His ultimately terminal cancer was diagnosed in 1987; he died in June 1991.

Zoot Sims, who had known Getz since their time with Herman, once described him as "a nice bunch of guys", an allusion to his unpredictable personality. Bob Brookmeyer, another performing colleague, responded to speculation Getz had a heart operation with a query: “Did they put one in?”

Death
Getz died of liver cancer on June 6, 1991. His ashes were poured from his saxophone case six miles off the coast of Marina del Rey, California.
In 1998, the Stan Getz Media Center and Library at Berklee College of Music was dedicated through a donation from the Herb Alpert Foundation.

Discography

Awards
 Grammy Award for Best Jazz Performance, Soloist or Small Group (Instrumental)  "Desafinado", 1962
 Grammy Award for Record of the Year, "The Girl from Ipanema", 1964
 Grammy Award for Album of the Year, Getz/Gilberto, Stan Getz and João Gilberto (Verve) 1964
 Grammy Award for Best Instrumental Jazz Performance, Small Group or Soloist With Small Group, Getz/Gilberto, Stan Getz 1964
 Grammy Award for Best Jazz Solo Performance, "I Remember You", 1991

Bibliography
Astrup, Arne. The Stan Getz Discography, 1978.
Churchill, Nicholas. Stan Getz: An Annotated Bibliography and Filmography, 2005.
Gelly, Dave. Stan Getz: Nobody Else But Me, 2002.
Kirkpatrick, Ron. Stan Getz: An Appreciation of His Recorded Work, 1992.

Palmer, Richard. Stan Getz, 1988.
Taylor, Dennis. Jazz Saxophone: An In-depth Look at the Styles of the Tenor Masters, 2004.

References

External links 

 
 1986 Interview
 Getz discography

1927 births
1991 deaths
American jazz saxophonists
American male saxophonists
Cool jazz saxophonists
Crossover jazz saxophonists
Hard bop saxophonists
Bebop saxophonists
Jazz fusion saxophonists
Jazz tenor saxophonists
Swing saxophonists
Jazz musicians from California
Jewish American musicians
Grammy Award winners
Musicians from New York City
Musicians from Philadelphia
People from the Bronx
People from Malibu, California
American people of Ukrainian-Jewish descent
Brazilian jazz (genre) saxophonists
Deaths from liver cancer
Custom Records artists
MGM Records artists
Savoy Records artists
SteepleChase Records artists
Verve Records artists
Jewish jazz musicians
20th-century American saxophonists
Jazz musicians from New York (state)
Jazz musicians from Pennsylvania
20th-century American male musicians
American male jazz musicians
James Monroe High School (New York City) alumni
Kenny Clarke/Francy Boland Big Band members
20th-century American Jews